Mordellapygium is a genus of beetles in the family Mordellidae, containing the following species:

 Mordellapygium elongatum Ray, 1930
 Mordellapygium philippinensis Ray, 1930

References

Mordellidae